Quixito River is a river of Amazonas state in north-western Brazil. It is a tributary of the Solimões near the village of Atalaia do Norte.

See also
List of rivers of Amazonas
Vale do Javari

References
Brazilian Ministry of Transport

Rivers of Amazonas (Brazilian state)